Laetesia intermedia is a species of sheet weaver found in New Zealand. It was described by Blest & Vink in 2003.

References

Linyphiidae
Spiders described in 2003
Spiders of New Zealand